Pitcairn Radio Station was a radio station located at Taro Ground near the southern coast of Pitcairn Island in the south Pacific. It was located on the highest point of the island at 272 metres above sea level. It was used by the New Zealand Meteorological Service, and VP6PAC, the Pitcairn Island Amateur Radio club. Its location was considered for a wind farm to supply the island's population with electricity but this initiative has stalled in 2013 when the contractors never delivered.

References

Pitcairn Islands
Radio stations in British Overseas Territories and Crown Dependencies
Buildings and structures in the Pitcairn Islands
Organisations based in the Pitcairn Islands
Defunct radio stations in the United Kingdom